Martina Hingis (30 September 1980) is a Swiss former professional tennis player. Hingis is the first Swiss player, male or female, to win a major title and attain a world No. 1 ranking. She spent a total of 209 weeks as the singles world No. 1 and 90 weeks as doubles world No. 1, holding both No. 1 rankings simultaneously for 29 weeks. She won five major singles titles, 13 major women's doubles titles (including the Grand Slam in 1998), and seven major mixed doubles titles, for a combined total of 25 major titles. In addition, she won the season-ending WTA Finals two times in singles and three in doubles, an Olympic silver medal in doubles, and a record 17 Tier I singles titles.

Hingis set a series of "youngest-ever" records during the 1990s, including youngest-ever Grand Slam champion and youngest-ever world No. 1. Before ligament injuries in both ankles forced her to withdraw temporarily from professional tennis in early 2003, at the age of 22, she had won 40 singles titles and 36 doubles titles and, according to Forbes, was the highest-paid female athlete in the world for five consecutive years, 1997 to 2001. After several surgeries and long recoveries, Hingis returned to the WTA Tour in 2006, climbing to world No. 6, winning two Tier I tournaments, and receiving the Laureus World Sports Award for Comeback of the Year. She retired in November 2007 after being hampered by a hip injury for several months.

In July 2013, Hingis again returned from retirement to play the doubles events of the North American hardcourt season. During her doubles-only comeback, she won four major women's doubles tournaments, six major mixed doubles tournaments (completing the career Grand Slam in mixed doubles), 27 WTA Tour titles, and the silver medal in women's doubles at the 2016 Rio Olympics. Hingis retired for the third and final time after the 2017 WTA Finals, while ranked as the world No. 1.

Widely considered an all-time tennis great, Hingis was ranked by Tennis magazine in 2005 as the eighth-greatest female player of the preceding 40 years. She was named one of the "30 Legends of Women's Tennis: Past, Present and Future" by TIME in June 2011. In 2013, Hingis was elected into the International Tennis Hall of Fame, and was appointed two years later the organization's first ever Global Ambassador.

Personal life

Hingis was born in Košice, Czechoslovakia (now in Slovakia) as Martina Hingisová, to Melanie Molitorová and Karol Hingis, both of whom were tennis players. Molitorová was a professional tennis player who was once ranked tenth among women in Czechoslovakia, and was determined to develop Hingis into a top player as early as pregnancy. Her father was ranked as high as 19th in the Czechoslovak tennis rankings. Martina Hingis spent her early childhood growing up in the town of Rožnov pod Radhoštěm (now in the Czech Republic). Hingis's parents divorced when she was six, and she and her mother defected from Czechoslovakia in 1987 and emigrated to Trübbach (Wartau) in Switzerland when she was seven. Her mother remarried to a Swiss man, Andreas Zogg, a computer technician. Hingis acquired Swiss citizenship through naturalization.

Hingis speaks four languages: German, Czech, English and French.

On 10 December 2010, in Paris, Hingis married then-24-year-old Thibault Hutin, a French equestrian show jumper she had met at a competition the previous April. On 8 July 2013, Hingis told the Swiss newspaper Schweizer Illustrierte the pair had been separated since the beginning of the year.

On 20 July 2018, Hingis married sports physician Harald Leemann in Switzerland in a secret ceremony at the Grand Resort Bad Ragaz. Hingis and Leemann had been in a relationship for almost a year before they got married. They were both 37. On 30 September 2018 (her 38th birthday) Hingis announced, via social media, her first pregnancy. She gave birth to a daughter, Lia, on 26 February 2019.

Tennis career

Hingis began playing tennis when she was two years old and entered her first tournament at age four. In 1993, 12-year-old Hingis became the youngest player to win a Grand Slam junior title: the girls' singles at the French Open. In 1994, she retained her French Open junior title, won the girls' singles title at Wimbledon, and reached the final of the US Open.

She made her WTA debut at the Zurich Open in October 1994, two weeks after turning 14, and ended 1994 ranked world No. 87.

Grand Slam success and period of dominance (1996–2000)

1996

In 1996, Hingis became the youngest Grand Slam champion of all time, when she teamed with Helena Suková at Wimbledon to win the women's doubles title at age 15 years and 9 months. She also won her first professional singles title that year at Filderstadt, Germany. She reached the singles quarterfinals of the 1996 Australian Open and the singles semifinals of the 1996 US Open. Following her win at Filderstadt, Hingis defeated the reigning Australian Open champion and co-top ranked (with Steffi Graf) Monica Seles in the final in Oakland, but lost to Graf in the year-end WTA Tour Championships final in five sets.

1997

In 1997, Hingis became the World No. 1 women's tennis player. She started the year by winning the warm-up tournament in Sydney. She then became the youngest Grand Slam singles winner in the 20th century by winning the Australian Open at age 16 years and 3 months (beating former champion Mary Pierce in the final). She also won the Australian Open women's doubles with Natasha Zvereva. In March, she became the youngest top ranked player in history. In July, she became the youngest singles champion at Wimbledon since Lottie Dod in 1887 by beating Jana Novotná in the final. She then defeated another up-and-coming player, Venus Williams, in the final of the US Open. The only Grand Slam singles title that Hingis failed to win in 1997 was the French Open, where she lost in the final to Iva Majoli.

1998: Doubles Grand Slam

In 1998, Hingis won all four of the Grand Slam women's doubles titles, only the fourth in women's tennis history to do so, (the Australian Open with Mirjana Lučić and the other three events with Novotná), and she became only the third woman to hold the No. 1 ranking in both singles and doubles simultaneously. She also retained her Australian Open singles title by beating Conchita Martínez in straight sets in the final. Hingis, however, lost in the final of the US Open to Lindsay Davenport. Davenport ended an 80-week stretch Hingis had enjoyed as the No. 1 singles player in October 1998, but Hingis finished the year by beating Davenport in the final of the WTA Tour Championships.

1999

1999 saw Hingis win her third successive Australian Open singles crown as well as the doubles title (with Anna Kournikova). She had dropped her former doubles partner Jana Novotná.
She then reached the French Open final and was three points away from victory in the second set before losing to Steffi Graf about whom she had said before: "Steffi had some results in the past, but it's a faster, more athletic game now... She is old now. Her time has passed." She broke into tears after a game in which the crowd had booed her for using underhand serves and crossing the line in a discussion about an umpire decision. After a shock first-round, straight set, loss to Jelena Dokić at Wimbledon, Hingis bounced back to reach her third consecutive US Open final, where she lost to 17-year-old Serena Williams. Hingis won a total of seven singles titles that year and reclaimed the No. 1 singles ranking. She also reached the final of the WTA Tour Championships, where she lost to Lindsay Davenport.

2000

In 2000, Hingis again found herself in both the singles and doubles finals at the Australian Open. This time, however, she lost both. Her three-year hold on the singles championship ended when she lost to Davenport. Later, Hingis and Mary Pierce, her new doubles partner, lost to Lisa Raymond and Rennae Stubbs. Hingis captured the French Open women's doubles title with Pierce and produced consistent results in singles tournaments throughout the year. She reached the quarterfinals at Wimbledon before losing to Venus Williams. Although she did not win a Grand Slam singles tournament, the first time this had happened since 1996, she kept the year end No. 1 ranking because of nine tournament championships, including the WTA Tour Championships where she won the singles and doubles titles.

Injuries and first retirement from tennis (2001–2003)

2001

In 2001, Switzerland, with Hingis and Roger Federer on its team, won the Hopman Cup. Hingis didn't drop a set in any of her singles matches during the event, defeating Tamarine Tanasugarn, Nicole Pratt, Amanda Coetzer, and Monica Seles. In 2018, after his second Hopman Cup victory, Federer was quoted as saying: "I learned a lot from her, especially the two years I was here – once as a hitting partner and once as a partner with Martina. Definitely she helped me to become the player I am today."

Hingis reached her fifth consecutive Australian Open final in 2001, defeating both of the Williams sisters en route, before losing to Jennifer Capriati. She briefly ended her coaching relationship with her mother Melanie early in the year but had a change of heart two months later just before the French Open. 2001 was her least successful year in several seasons, with only three tournament victories in total. She lost her No. 1 ranking for the last time (to Jennifer Capriati) on 14 October 2001. In that same month, Hingis underwent surgery on her right ankle.

2002

Coming back from injury, Hingis won the Australian Open doubles final at the start of 2002 (again teaming with Anna Kournikova) and reached a sixth straight Australian Open final in singles, again facing Capriati. Hingis led by a set and 4–0 and had four match points but lost in three sets. In May 2002, she needed another ankle ligament operation, this time on her left ankle. After that, she continued to struggle with injuries and was not able to recapture her best form.

2003

In February 2003, at the age of 22, Hingis announced her retirement from tennis, due to her injuries and being in pain. "I want to play tennis only for fun and concentrate more on horse riding and finish my studies." In several interviews, she indicated that she wished to return to her home country and coach full-time.

During this segment of her tennis career (until what would become her first retirement), Hingis won a total of 40 singles titles and 36 doubles. She held the world No. 1 singles ranking for a total of 209 weeks (fifth most following Steffi Graf, Martina Navratilova, Chris Evert, and Serena Williams). In 2005, Tennis magazine put her in 22nd place in its list of 40 Greatest Players of the Tennis era.

Return to the game (2005–2007)

2005

In February 2005, Hingis came out of retirement and made an unsuccessful return to competition. This took place at an event in Pattaya, Thailand, where she lost to Germany's Marlene Weingärtner in the first round. After the loss, she claimed that she had no further plans to continue further and make a full-fledged comeback.

Hingis, however, resurfaced in July, playing singles, doubles, and mixed doubles in World Team Tennis and notching up singles victories over two top 100 players and shutting out Martina Navratilova in singles on 7 July. With these promising results behind her, Hingis announced on 29 November her return to the next season's WTA Tour.

2006

At the Australian Open, Hingis lost in the quarterfinals to second-seeded Kim Clijsters. However, Hingis won the mixed doubles title with Mahesh Bhupathi of India. This was her first career Grand Slam mixed doubles title and fifteenth overall (5 singles, 9 women's doubles, 1 mixed doubles).

The week after the Australian Open, Hingis defeated world No. 4 Maria Sharapova in the semifinals of the Tier I Toray Pan Pacific Open in Tokyo before losing in the final to world No. 9 Elena Dementieva. Hingis competed in Dubai then, reaching the quarterfinals before falling to Sharapova. At the Tier I Pacific Life Open in Indian Wells, Hingis defeated World No. 4 Lindsay Davenport in the fourth round before again losing to Sharapova in the semifinals.

At the Tier I Internazionali BNL d'Italia in Rome, Hingis posted her 500th career singles match victory in the quarterfinals, beating world No. 18 Flavia Pennetta, and subsequently won the tournament with wins over Venus Williams in the semifinals and Dinara Safina in the final. This was her 41st WTA Tour singles title and first in more than four years. Hingis then reached the quarterfinals of the French Open before losing to Kim Clijsters.

At Wimbledon, Hingis lost in the third round to Ai Sugiyama.

Hingis's return to the US Open was short lived, as she was upset in the second round by world No. 112 Virginie Razzano of France.

In her first tournament after the US Open, Hingis won the second title of her comeback at the Tier III Sunfeast Open in Kolkata, India. She defeated unseeded Russian Olga Puchkova in the final. The following week in Seoul, Hingis notched her 50th match win of the year before losing in the second round to Sania Mirza.

Hingis qualified for the year-ending WTA Tour Championships in Madrid as the 8th seed. In her round robin matches, she lost in three sets to both Justine Henin and Amélie Mauresmo but defeated Nadia Petrova.

Hingis ended the year ranked world No. 7. She also finished eighth in prize money earnings (US$1,159,537). Hingis also ranked as No. 7 on the Annual Top Google News Searches in 2006.

2007

At the Australian Open, Hingis won her first three rounds without losing a set before defeating China's Li Na in the fourth round. Hingis then lost a quarterfinal match to Kim Clijsters. This was the second consecutive year that Hingis had lost to Clijsters in the quarterfinals of the Australian Open and the third time in the last five Grand Slam tournaments that Clijsters had eliminated Hingis in the quarterfinals.

Hingis won her next tournament, the Tier I Toray Pan Pacific Open in Tokyo, defeating Ana Ivanovic in the final. This was Hingis's record fifth singles title at this event.

A hip injury that troubled her at the German Open caused her to withdraw from the Rome Masters, where she was the defending champion, and the French Open, the only important singles title that eluded her.

In her first round match at Wimbledon, Hingis saved two match points to defeat British wildcard Naomi Cavaday, apparently not having fully recovered from the hip injury that prevented her from playing the French Open. In the third round, Hingis lost to Laura Granville of the United States, and stated afterwards she should not have entered the tournament.

Hingis's next tournament was the last Grand Slam tournament of the year, the US Open, in which Hingis lost in the third round to Belarusian teenager Victoria Azarenka. Hingis did not play any tournaments after the China Open, as she was beset by injuries for the rest of the year.

ITF suspension and second retirement (2007–2012) 

In November 2007, Hingis called a press conference to announce that she was under investigation for testing positive for benzoylecgonine, a metabolite of cocaine, during a urine test taken by players at Wimbledon. Hingis's urine sample contained an estimated 42 nanograms per millilitre of benzoylecgonine. The International Tennis Federation's report on the matter states that "the very low estimated concentration of benzoylecgonine (42 ng/ml) was such that it would go unreported in many drug testing programmes such as that of the US military, which uses a screening threshold of 150 ng/ml." As the amount was so low, Hingis appealed, arguing the likely cause was contamination rather than intentional ingestion. In January 2008, the ITF's tribunal suspended Hingis from the sport for two years, effective from October 2007.

At the time of Hingis's suspension, the ITF required an automatic two-year suspension for any players who tested positive for banned substances, regardless of extenuating circumstances such as contamination or extremely low detection levels. The ITF subsequently altered the suspension rules as a result of the Hingis case, allowing for future flexibility in cases of unintentional or unexplained ingestion.

2008–09

Having retired for the second time in 2007, Hingis played an exhibition match at the Liverpool International tournament on 13 June 2008. Although this event was a warm-up for Wimbledon, it was not part of the WTA Tour. In a rematch of their 1997 Wimbledon final, Hingis defeated Jana Novotná.

In 2009, Hingis took part in the British television dancing competition Strictly Come Dancing. She was the bookies' favourite for the competition, but went out in the first week after performing a waltz and a rumba.

2010

At the start of 2010, Hingis defeated former world No. 1 Lindsay Davenport, and hinted at a possible return to tennis. In February, she announced having committed to a full season with the World TeamTennis tour in 2010. She had previously played for World TeamTennis in 2005 to assist her first comeback. Sparking thoughts that she was trying to come back to the WTA Tour, she committed to playing at the Nottingham Masters. On 5 May 2010, it was announced that Hingis would reunite with her doubles partner Anna Kournikova. Kournikova was participating in competitive tennis for the first time in seven years, in the Invitational Ladies Doubles event at Wimbledon. Hingis also confirmed that she would play at the Tradition-ICAP Liverpool International championship in June 2010, preceding Wimbledon, before playing in the Manchester Masters after Wimbledon. Liverpool like the Nottingham and Manchester Masters are organised by her management company Northern Vision. At the Nottingham Masters, Hingis faced Michaëlla Krajicek (twice), Olga Savchuk and Monika Wejnert. Hingis won just once in the event, against Wejnert. After the Nottingham event, Billie Jean King stated that she believed that Hingis might return to the WTA Tour on the doubles circuit, after competing in the WTT.

2011

On 5 June 2011, Hingis, paired with Lindsay Davenport, won the Roland Garros Women's Legends title, defeating Martina Navratilova and Jana Novotná in the final. Before facing Navratilova/Novotná, Hingis and Davenport won two round-robin matches in the tournament: first against Gigi Fernández/Natasha Zvereva, and then in the next match they prevailed over Andrea Temesvári/Sandrine Testud and 10:0 in the super tie-break.

On 3 July, Hingis partnering Lindsay Davenport won the Wimbledon Ladies' Invitation Doubles title, defeating Navratilova and Novotná in the final.
She also played for the New York Sportimes of the World TeamTennis Pro League in July 2011. She finished the season with the top winning percentage of any player competing in women's singles.

2012

Hingis and Davenport successfully defended their Wimbledon Ladies' Invitation Doubles title in 2012, again beating Martina Navratilova and Jana Novotná in the final.

Second return and doubles success (2013–2017)

2013: Coming out of retirement

In April 2013, Hingis agreed to coach Anastasia Pavlyuchenkova; however, after a disagreement about how to prepare for tournaments they parted ways in June.

Hingis won the Ladies' Invitation Doubles for a third year in a row at Wimbledon, again with Davenport. They beat Jana Novotná and Barbara Schett in the final. Hingis was inducted into the International Tennis Hall of Fame in July 2013, and in the same month, announced that she was coming out of retirement to play a doubles tournament, with Daniela Hantuchová as her partner, in Carlsbad, California. She was accepted as a wildcard entry. She also played doubles in Toronto, Cincinnati, New Haven, and the US Open.

2014: US Open doubles finalist

Hingis helped Sabine Lisicki during the Australian Open. She participated in Champions Tennis League India to boost tennis in the country.

Hingis returned to the WTA Tour at Indian Wells, partnering Lisicki in the doubles. They lost in the first round to three-time Grand Slam finalists Ashleigh Barty and Casey Dellacqua. At the Sony Open in Miami, Hingis and Lisicki reached the finals of the tournament and then defeated Makarova and Vesnina in straight sets, marking Hingis's first title since she won the Qatar Ladies Open in 2007 and her first Premier Mandatory doubles title since winning the 2001 title in Moscow. This was also her third win in Miami, having won her last title there in 1999.

Hingis reached the final at Eastbourne with Pennetta where they lost to Chan Hao-ching and Chan Yung-jan of Taiwan. At the Wimbledon Championships, she reached the quarterfinals with partner Bruno Soares in mixed doubles, where they lost to Daniel Nestor and Kristina Mladenovic in straight sets.

Entering as an unseeded team at the US Open, Hingis and Pennetta reached the final, without losing a set in any of their matches. In the final they lost to Makarova and Vesnina in three sets.

At the latter end of the season, Hingis and Flavia Pennetta won two titles. At the tournament in Wuhan, they beat Cara Black and Caroline Garcia to take the title; in Moscow they beat Caroline Garcia and Arantxa Parra Santonja.

2015: Five Major doubles titles

In Hingis's first tournament of the year in Brisbane, she and partner Sabine Lisicki didn't drop a set en route to the title, beating Caroline Garcia and Katarina Srebotnik in straight sets in the final. Hingis played at the Australian Open with Flavia Pennetta, as the 4th seeds, but lost in the third round. However, Hingis paired with Leander Paes in the mixed doubles to win the title. The win was her first in a Grand Slam event since capturing the mixed-doubles crown at the 2006 Australian Open.

After early exits with Pennetta at the Dubai Tennis Championships and Qatar Ladies Open, Hingis then partnered with Indian player Sania Mirza; they won the first 20 sets they contested, subsequently winning back-to-back titles in two WTA Premier Mandatory events: the BNP Paribas Open in Indian Wells and the Miami Open, also winning afterwise the Family Circle Cup. They were defeated in the first round in Stuttgart. At the Madrid Open they lost in the quarterfinals to Australian Open champions Bethanie Mattek-Sands and Lucie Šafářová 11–9 in the super tie-break. They reached the quarterfinals of the French Open, losing again to Mattek-Sands and Šafářová, this time in straight sets.

Hingis made a comeback in Fed Cup after a 17-year absence. She was scheduled to play doubles only, but then decided to try another comeback in singles by playing in the Fed Cup tie for Switzerland. She drew Agnieszka Radwańska in the first rubber and was defeated in two sets in her first official tour match since 2007. She lost her second singles rubber too, defeated by Urszula Radwańska in three sets, having been a set and a double break up.

On 11 July 2015, Hingis and Mirza beat Makarova and Vesnina in three tight sets recovering from 5–2 down in the third to win the women's doubles tournament at Wimbledon. The win gave Hingis her first Grand Slam in women's doubles since the 2002 Australian Open. The following day, Hingis then won the mixed doubles final partnering with Leander Paes to defeat Alexander Peya and Tímea Babos in straight sets.

After two semifinal losses in Toronto and Cincinnati, Hingis won the mixed doubles title at the US Open on 12 September, partnering Paes, defeating Sam Querrey and Bethanie Mattek-Sands in three sets. The following day, Hingis and Mirza beat Casey Dellacqua and Yaroslava Shvedova in straight sets to win the doubles tournament. At the WTA Finals, they won all their group matches, including against Kops-Jones/Spears, Hlavackova/Hradecka and Babos/Mladenovic. In the semifinals they beat the Chan sisters, and then they beat the Spanish team Muguruza/Suarez Navarro to win the title. That month Hingis participated at the Champions Tennis League in India, playing for the Hyderabad Aces team.

2016: Mixed-doubles Career Grand Slam

In January, Hingis and Mirza won at Brisbane and Sydney. They then won the doubles tournament at the Australian Open, defeating Hlaváčková and Hradecká in the final, for their third consecutive Grand Slam title. Afterwards, Hingis said of their partnership: "There's not that many people who can match her in the forehand rallies and me on the backhand side and at the net. That's what we try to do every match." In mixed doubles, Hingis and Paes lost in the quarterfinals to Mirza and Ivan Dodig.

In February, Hingis represented Switzerland in the Fed Cup tie against Germany alongside Belinda Bencic and Timea Bacsinszky. Switzerland beat Germany 3–2, with Hingis and Bencic clinching the doubles rubber. Switzerland advanced to the semifinals, where the team lost to the defending champions the Czech Republic.

The Hingis-Mirza winning-streak record of 41 matches ended in the quarterfinals of the Qatar Total Open, where they lost to Kasatkina/Vesnina. Hingis and Mirza then proceeded to the BNP Paribas Open to defend their title. However, they suffered a shock as the unseeded Vania King/Alla Kudryavtseva defeated them in straight sets, 7–6(7), 6–4.

At the Miami Open, Mirza and Hingis lost in the second round to Margarita Gasparyan and Monica Niculescu.

Hingis and Mirza started their clay season by reaching the finals of Porsche Tennis Grand Prix and Mutua Madrid Open, where they lost to Kristina Mladenovic and Caroline Garcia in both the tournaments. However, they won the Italian Open, defeating Makarova and Vesnina. At the French Open, they were upset by Czech pair Barbora Krejčíková and Kateřina Siniaková in the third round, which ended their 20 match winning streak in Grand Slam doubles tournaments.

Hingis won the French Open mixed doubles partnering Leander Paes. It is her first mixed doubles title at Roland Garros, and she completed the mixed-doubles Career Grand Slam, becoming only the fourth woman ever to complete a career grand slam in both women's doubles and mixed doubles.

Hingis qualified for the 2016 Summer Olympics in Rio de Janeiro, 20 years after her last Olympic appearance. She played doubles with Timea Bacsinszky and won the silver medal, losing to Ekaterina Makarova and Elena Vesnina in straight sets in the final. Hingis then played at the US Open with CoCo Vandeweghe, where they made the semifinals and lost to top seeds Garcia and Mladenovic. At the WTA Finals, Hingis reunited with Sania Mirza in what would be the partnership's last tournament together; they defeated the Chan sisters in the quarterfinals but then lost to Makarova and Vesnina.

2017: Three Major doubles titles, back to world No. 1 & final retirement

Hingis continued to partner CoCo Vandeweghe in women's doubles competition at the start of the season. Together they reached the quarterfinals of the Sydney International, losing to eventual champions Tímea Babos and Anastasia Pavlyuchenkova, and the second round of the Australian Open, losing to the Australian duo of Ashleigh Barty and Casey Dellacqua. This capped a run of poor form, having gone 5–5 in tournaments since they made the semifinals at the US Open the previous season. As a result, Hingis split with Vandeweghe and entered a new partnership with Taiwan's Chan Yung-jan, who herself had just split with her sister Chan Hao-ching. In the mixed doubles competition at the Australian Open, Hingis reached the quarterfinals with Leander Paes before losing to another Australian duo, Samantha Stosur and Sam Groth in straight sets.

In preparation for the upcoming Fed Cup quarterfinal match between Switzerland and France, Hingis partnered with Belinda Bencic to defend her St. Petersburg title. The pair lost in the first round to Gabriela Dabrowski and Michaëlla Krajicek. In the Fed Cup quarterfinal match, Hingis instead paired up with Timea Bacsinszky and won their doubles match against Amandine Hesse and Kristina Mladenovic, helping the team to a 4–1 victory to advance to the semifinals.

In the first two tournaments of their new partnership, Hingis and Chan suffered some "tough" losses. They fell to Olga Savchuk and Yaroslava Shvedova in the semifinals of the Qatar Open and to Andrea Hlaváčková and Peng Shuai in straight sets in the quarterfinals of the Dubai Tennis Championships. However, they immediately rebounded by winning their first title together at the Indian Wells Open, defeating Hingis's old partner Sania Mirza with Barbora Strýcová in the quarterfinals, top seeded Mattek-Sands and Šafářová in the semifinals, and Czech pair Lucie Hradecká and Kateřina Siniaková in the final. They then reached the semifinals of the Miami Open, before losing to Mirza and Strýcová.

Hingis again sought to practice with a Swiss partner before the Fed Cup semifinal clash of Switzerland versus Belarus, and this time paired up with Bacsinszky to enter the inaugural Ladies Open Biel Bienne. Hingis and Bacsinszky reached the final, succumbing there to Hsieh Su-wei and Monica Niculescu. Despite winning her doubles rubber with Bacsinszky in the Fed Cup semifinal tie, Switzerland would ultimately lose 2–3. Switzerland had been seeking to reach its first final since Hingis had spearheaded the team to a narrow defeat to Spain in 1998.

In the clay-court season, Hingis and Chan continued their good form to win back-to-back titles at the Madrid and Italian Opens, defeating Tímea Babos and Andrea Hlaváčková and Ekaterina Makarova and Elena Vesnina respectively, in the finals of each event. Hingis's victory in Madrid was her 100th WTA career title. This success marked the pair as one of the pre-tournament favorites to win the French Open. Hingis and Chan reached the semifinals, where their 12 match winning streak was ended by eventual champions Mattek-Sands and Šafářová. Hingis and Paes lost in the opening round of the mixed doubles competition to Katarina Srebotnik and Raven Klaasen in a super tiebreak.

Hingis and Chan again won back-to-back titles, this time at the Mallorca Open and the Eastbourne International. At Mallorca, they won the title by walkover after Jelena Janković and Anastasija Sevastova withdrew from the title match owing to an injury sustained by Sevastova in the singles competition. At Eastbourne, they won after defeating Barty and Dellacqua in the final. However, like the French Open two months previous, Hingis and Chan could not replicate the success at Grand Slam level: losing at the quarterfinal stage to Grönefeld and Peschke at Wimbledon. In the mixed doubles competition, Hingis paired up with new partner Great Britain's Jamie Murray after splitting from Leander Paes. As top seeds they reached the final without losing a set, before defeating defending champions Heather Watson and Henri Kontinen in the championship match.

Hingis and Chan next played at the Canadian Open, where the German-Czech pair of Grönefeld and Peschke defeated them for the second tournament in a row in the quarterfinals. However, not to be deterred, a week later at the Cincinnati Open they produced another winning run and defeated Hsieh and Niculescu in the final to capture their next title together. On 14 August, Hingis and Chan became one of the first teams to qualify for the doubles competition at the year-end WTA Finals.

At the US Open, Hingis emerged victorious from both the women's and the mixed doubles competition. Jamie Murray and she defeated Chan Hao-ching and Michael Venus in the final to capture their second consecutive title together and remain undefeated as a pair. Then, less than 24 hours later with Chan, they defeated Hradecká and Siniaková in the final to win their first Major title together. In total, this was Hingis's 25th Grand Slam title across all disciplines.

Hingis and Chan extended their winning run to 18 matches in China by winning their third and fourth straight titles: the Wuhan and China Opens. In Wuhan, they defeated Shuko Aoyama and Yang Zhaoxuan in the final. With this win, Hingis ascended to the No. 1 ranking on 2 October for the 67th week in her career. In Beijing, they defeated Babos and Hlaváčková.

Hingis announced her retirement at the WTA finals in Singapore in October, 2017.

Playing style

Hingis was an all-court player who possessed an intelligent, crafty game. Hingis compensated for her lack of power with superior movement, anticipation, finesse, point construction, shot selection, and knowledge of the geometry of the court. Hingis used an Eastern grip for her forehand, allowing her to create sharp angles and dictate play. Her two-handed backhand was her most effective groundstroke, and was used to redirect power down the line. She could also hit her backhand one-handed with slice, and would use this shot to break up the pace of rallies. Her serve was not particularly powerful, and she rarely served aces, but was reliable, and she was proficient at defending her serve. She was one of the most effective returners on the WTA tour, positioning herself on the baseline to return first serves, and her superior sense of anticipation allowed her to read serves effectively. Due to her doubles experience, Hingis was one of the most effective players at the net on the WTA tour, possessing an almost complete repertoire of shots at the net, and she would frequently choose to finish points off at the net. One of Hingis's favourite combinations was a drop shot, followed by a lob; if the lob was returned, a simple volley would allow her to win the point efficiently. Hingis's major weaknesses were her nerves and inconsistency, which became more prominent later in her career. Hingis was comfortable, and proficient on, all surfaces, although she never won a singles title at the French Open.

Career statistics

Singles performance timeline

 2If ITF Women's Circuit (hardcourt: 12–2; carpet: 6–1) and Fed Cup (10–0) participations are included, overall win–loss record: 548–133.

Grand Slam singles finals: 12 (5–7)

Doubles

Grand Slam doubles finals: 16 (13–3)

By winning the 1998 US Open title, Hingis completed the doubles Career Grand Slam, becoming the 17th female player in history to achieve this, as well as the youngest. It also meant she completed the Calendar Year Grand Slam, becoming the fourth woman in history to achieve the feat in doubles.

Mixed doubles

Mixed doubles finals: 7 (7–0)

By winning the 2016 French Open title, Hingis completed the mixed doubles Career Grand Slam. She became the 7th female player in history to achieve this.

Records

 These records were attained in the Open Era of tennis.

 By winning Wimbledon doubles title in 1996 with Helena Suková became youngest doubles winner at 15 years, 282 days and youngest ever Grand Slam winner.
 By winning Australian singles title in 1997, became youngest winner there in tennis history at 16 years and 3 months.
 By defeating Monica Seles 6–2, 6–1 in 1997 at Key Biscayne, ascended the no. 1 spot as the youngest ever in tennis history.
 Became the youngest ever year-end No.1 in 1997 in tennis history.
 By winning the US Open against Venus Williams in 1997, Hingis contended all Grand Slam tournament finals that year; second youngest winner in the US Open at 16 years, 11 months and 8 days.
 Won the Australian and US Open in 1997 without losing a set.
 In 1997, from Sydney to the final of Roland Garros had a 37-match winning streak, best from 1995 until present.
 By winning the US Open doubles title in 1998 with Jana Novotná, completed a doubles Grand Slam, third player in the Open Era.
 Held simultaneously the no. 1 position for singles and doubles in 1998.
 Most successful player to play the Toray Pan-Pacific Tournament with 5 wins in 1997, 1999, 2000, 2002, 2007, and reached 8 finals in 1997, 1998, 1999, 2000, 2001, 2002, 2006, 2007.
 Compiled 103 top-10 wins (behind Serena Williams 164, Lindsay Davenport 129, and Venus Williams 127), 43 singles titles, 64 doubles titles, 7 mixed doubles titles, and 209 weeks at no.1 (5th behind Steffi Graf, Martina Navratilova, Chris Evert and Serena Williams).
 In 2015, won three Grand Slam Mixed Doubles title with Leander Paes, an accomplishment last achieved in 1969 by Margaret Court and Marty Riessen
 Most Mixed Doubles titles (2) won by a woman player in Open Era in Australian Open
 Only player in the Open Era to win the Australian Open singles and doubles titles three consecutive years.
 1997 (S) d. Pierce, (D) w/Zvereva d. Davenport/Raymond
 1998 (S) d. Martinez, (D) w/Lučić d. Davenport/Zvereva
 1999 (S) d. Mauresmo, (D) w/Kournikova d. Davenport/Zvereva

Awards

 1992: Swiss Champion together with the tennisclub TC Schützenwiese (from Winterthur) in the Interclub-Championships.
 1994: ITF Junior Girls Singles World Champion.
 1995: WTA Newcomer of the Year.
 1995: Named "Female Rookie of the Year" by Tennis magazine.
 1996: WTA Most Improved Player of the Year.
 1997: Associated Press Female Athlete of the Year.
 1997: WTA Player of the Year.
 1997: ITF World Champion – Women's singles.
 1997: BBC Overseas Sports Personality of the Year.
 1998: First female athlete to be on the cover of the American men's magazine GQ in June 1998.
 1998: WTA Doubles Team of the Year (with Jana Novotná).
 1999: WTA Doubles Team of the Year (with Anna Kournikova).
 1999: ITF World Champion – Women's Singles.
 1999: ITF World Champion – Women's doubles (with Anna Kournikova).
 2000: ITF World Champion – Women's Singles.
 2000: One of five female tennis players named to the 2000 Forbes magazine Power 100 in Fame and Fortune list at No. 51.
 2000: WTA Diamond Aces Award.
 2002: Elected to Tour Players' Council.
 2006: Laureus World Sports Award for Comeback of the Year.
 2007: Surpassed US$20 million in career earnings at the Sony Ericsson Open in Key Biscayne, Florida, the fourth female player to do so (after Steffi Graf, Martina Navratilova, and Lindsay Davenport). She was fourth in the all-time money list at $20,033,600 after the tournament.
 2007: Meredith Inspiration Award for inspiring women around the world – Family Circle Cup/Family Circle magazine
 2013: Inducted into the International Tennis Hall of Fame on 13 July 2013
 2015: First Global Ambassador for the International Tennis Hall of Fame.
 2015: WTA Doubles Team of the Year with Sania Mirza.
 2015: ITF World Champion – Women's Doubles (with Sania Mirza).
 2017: WTA Doubles Team of the Year with Chan Yung-jan.
 2017: ITF World Champion – Women's Doubles (with Chan Yung-jan).

Notable accolades 

 Except for the French Open, she won every major WTA Tour singles title at least once during her career (Grand Slam tournaments, WTA Tour Championships, and Tier I tournaments).
 Except for Berlin, she won every major WTA Tour doubles title at least once during her career (Grand Slam tournaments, WTA Tour Championships, and Tier I tournaments).
 By reaching the 2016 French Open mixed doubles finals, Hingis joined an elite group of players who have reached the finals in all 4 Grand Slams across singles, doubles, and mixed doubles.

Equipment endorsements

Hingis's current on-court apparel is manufactured by Tonic Lifestyle Apparel; having her own clothing line: Tonic by Martina Hingis. She is sponsored by Yonex for racquets and shoes.

In the 1990s, Hingis was sponsored by Sergio Tacchini. In 1998 she suffered a foot injury, and she withdrew from the Wimbledon doubles competition in 1999. She sued the company in 2001 for making allegedly defective shoes that injured her feet.  Hingis and Tacchini settled in 2005 for an undisclosed amount of money. She was sponsored by Adidas from 1999 until 2008.

See also

 WTA Tour records
 List of WTA number 1 ranked singles players
 List of WTA number 1 ranked doubles players
 List of female tennis players
 List of tennis rivalries
 List of Grand Slam women's singles champions
 List of Grand Slam women's doubles champions
 Open Era tennis records – women's singles
 All-time tennis records – women's singles

References

External links

 
 
 
 
 
 
 
 ITF Press release: Decision in the case of Martina Hingis
 Representation Agency for Martina Hingis

1980 births
Living people
20th-century Swiss people
21st-century Swiss people
Australian Open (tennis) champions
Czechoslovak defectors
Czechoslovak emigrants to Switzerland
Doping cases in tennis
French Open junior champions
Grand Slam (tennis) champions in women's singles
Grand Slam (tennis) champions in women's doubles
Grand Slam (tennis) champions in mixed doubles
Grand Slam (tennis) champions in girls' singles
Grand Slam (tennis) champions in girls' doubles
International Tennis Hall of Fame inductees
Laureus World Sports Awards winners
Olympic tennis players of Switzerland
People from the canton of St. Gallen
Sportspeople from Košice
Swiss female tennis players
Swiss sportspeople in doping cases
Tennis players at the 1996 Summer Olympics
Tennis players at the 2016 Summer Olympics
US Open (tennis) champions
Wimbledon champions
Wimbledon junior champions
Olympic silver medalists for Switzerland
Medalists at the 2016 Summer Olympics
Olympic medalists in tennis
20th-century Swiss women
21st-century Swiss women
WTA number 1 ranked singles tennis players
WTA number 1 ranked doubles tennis players
ITF World Champions